Cyclostrema ocrinium is a species of sea snail, a marine gastropod mollusk in the family Liotiidae.

Description
The height of the shell attains 2 mm, its diameter 3 mm. The delicate, white, umbilicated shell contains four whorls. it is destitute of spiral ribs. The longitudinal riblets are very close and fine, about 26 in number on the five-angled body whorl, that surround the umbilicus at the base being the strongest and most conspicuous. Regular rows of shining gemmae on the costulae at the point of the angular projections take the place of spiral lirae. The interstices are plain, vitreous white. The aperture is circular. The peristome is continuous. The outer lip is crenulate. The columellar margin is not reflexed over the umbilicus, which is deep and conspicuous.

Distribution
This marine species occurs in the Persian Gulf and off Singapore.

References

 Trew, A., 1984. The Melvill-Tomlin Collection. Part 30. Trochacea. Handlists of the Molluscan Collections in the Department of Zoology, National Museum of Wales

External links
 To World Register of Marine Species

ocrinium
Gastropods described in 1901